Citizens Party or Citizens' Party may refer to:
Citizens (Spanish political party)
Citizens Party (Hong Kong)
Citizens' Party (Iceland, 1987)
Citizens' Party (Finland)
Citizens Party, a short-lived party label used in 1888 in Milwaukee (see Thomas H. Brown)
Citizens' Party (Singapore)
Citizens Party (United States), a short lived political party organized by Barry Commoner in 1979 and predecessor of the Green Party
Citizens Party of the United States, founded in 2010
Nationalist Citizens' Party of the Philippines
White Citizens Parties, local Jim Crow era parties in the Southern United States
Australian Citizens Party